The Harris County Transit Services Division is a transportation agency that serves areas of Harris County, Texas that do not have service from Metropolitan Transit Authority of Harris County, Texas (METRO). The agency, a division of the Harris County Community Services Department, has its headquarters in Harris County Annex M in Houston.

The agency serves the cities of Baytown, La Porte, Pasadena, Seabrook, Shoreacres, and South Houston. In addition the agency serves several unincorporated areas, including Crosby and Highlands. It also serves the portion of Clear Lake City in Houston.

References

External links

 Harris County Transit Services Division

Transportation in Houston
Transportation in Harris County, Texas